Talpini is a tribe of mammals known as Old World Moles. It is a division of the subfamily Talpinae.

This tribe contains the following genera and species:

 Tribe Talpini
 Genus Euroscaptor 
 Greater Chinese mole, E. grandis
 Kloss's mole, E. klossi
 Kuznetsov's mole, E. kuznetsovi
 Long-nosed mole, E. longirostris
 Malaysian mole, E. malayanus 
 Himalayan mole, E. micrurus
 Ngoc Linh mole, E. ngoclinhensis
 Orlov's mole, E. orlovi
 Small-toothed mole, E. parvidens
 Vietnamese mole, E. subanura
 Genus Mogera 
 Echigo mole, M. etigo
 Small Japanese mole, M. imaizumii
 Insular mole, M. insularis
 Kano's mole, M. kanoana
 La Touche's mole, M. latouchei
 Ussuri mole, M. robusta
 Sado mole, M. tokudae
 Senkaku mole, M. uchidai
 Japanese mole, M. wogura
 Genus Oreoscaptor
 Japanese mountain mole, O. mizura
 Genus Parascaptor
 White-tailed mole, P. leucura
 Genus Scaptochirus - China
 Short-faced mole, S. moschatus
 Genus Talpa 
 Altai mole, T. altaica
 Aquitanian mole, T. aquitania
 Blind mole, T. caeca
 Caucasian mole, T. caucasica
 Père David's mole, T. davidiana
 European mole, T. europaea
 Levant mole, T. levantis
 Martino's mole, T. martinorum
 Spanish mole, T. occidentalis
 Ognev's mole, T. ognevi
 Roman mole, T. romana
 Balkan mole, T. stankovici
 Talysch mole, T. talyschensis

References

 Animal Diversity Web http://animaldiversity.ummz.umich.edu/site/accounts/classification/Talpini.html
 Blackwell Synergy https://doi.org/10.1111/j.1096-0031.2006.00087.x
 Cambridge Journals http://journals.cambridge.org/action/displayAbstract?fromPage=online&aid=219299

 
Mammal tribes